Lefty Frizzell was an American country music singer-songwriter, who gained massive popularity in 1950, following an explosive debut two-sided single ("If You've Got the Money (I've Got the Time)," "I Love You A Thousand Ways"). He released a string of successful hits from 1950 to 1955. He released a country standard "Long Black Veil" in 1959, and released three mostly unnoticed LP's. After The Long Black Veil in 1959, Frizzell didn't chart another single until 1963. The next year, he released his last of six US Country chart toppers: "Saginaw, Michigan."

After that, he released his first charting album with the same title, and it peaked at No. 2 in the same year. In 1965, Frizzell charted his last Top 20 hit, titled, "She's Gone, Gone, Gone". After developing a drinking habit, he released songs that didn't chart very well, and in 1972, he left his longtime label Columbia Records, and signed to ABC Records. In 1975, he was inducted into the Nashville Songwriters Hall of Fame and was given the Grammy Hall of Fame Award. This success led to more money, then more drinking. On July 19, 1975, Frizzell suffered a massive stroke and later died at the age of 47.

After a 25-year career, Lefty Frizzell had charted a little over 30 singles, and released 13 studio albums. Today, he is regarded as one of the most influential voices in country music history, inspiring many of the next generation's artists. The following is collection of work gathered from 1950 to 2006:

Studio albums

Compilations

Singles

1950s

1960s

1970s

External links
 

Discographies of American artists
Country music discographies